Krš i lom is the second live album by the Serbian garage rock/punk rock band Partibrejkers, released by Odličan Hrčak in 2010. The album was also released for free digital download through the Exit Music record label.

Track listing 
All tracks written by Nebojša Antonijević "Anton" and Zoran Kostić "Cane".

Personnel 
Partibrejkers
 Nebojša Antonijević "Anton" — guitar
 Zoran Kostić "Cane" — vocals
 Darko Kurjak — drums
 Zlatko Veljović "Laki" — bass guitar

Additional personnel
 Sale Janković — producer
 Milan Barković "Bare" — recorded by
 Igor Borojević — sound technician
 Iva Rakić — design
 Aleksandar Polzović "Zvono — photography
 Branko Galičić — photography
 Stanislav Milojković — photography

References

External links
 Krš i lom at Discogs

2010 live albums
Partibrejkers live albums